True Metropolitan (foaled April 2, 2002 in Florida) is a Thoroughbred racehorse who has been voted Canada's Champion Older Male Horse in 2006 and 2007.

A gelding trained by Terry Jordan, True Metropolitan has won races at Toronto's Woodbine Racetrack and in the Western Canada at Northlands and Stampede Parks in Alberta and at Hastings Racecourse in Vancouver, British Columbia.

In June 2008, True Metropolitan surpassed the $1million mark in career earnings after winning the Eclipse Stakes.

References
 True Metropolitan's pedigree and partial racing stats
 Thoroughbred Times October 15, 2006 article on True Metropolitan's win in the British Columbia Premiers Handicap

2002 racehorse births
Thoroughbred family 14-c
Racehorses bred in Florida
Racehorses trained in Canada
Sovereign Award winners